Trichostachys interrupta is a species of plant in the family Rubiaceae. It is found in Cameroon and Nigeria. Its natural habitat is subtropical or tropical moist lowland forests. It is threatened by habitat loss.

References

interrupta
Vulnerable plants
Taxonomy articles created by Polbot